Igor Torres Sartori (born January 8, 1993, in Rio de Janeiro) is a Brazilian professional footballer who currently plays as a left winger for Hong Kong Premier League club Kitchee.

Sartori is the son of former Flamengo striker Alcindo Sartori.

Club career
Sartori made his debut in the 1–0 loss to Ventforet Kofu on 15 June 2011.

On 2 August 2017, Sartori was announced as a player of Hong Kong Premier League club Tai Po. On 13 May 2018, Tai Po manager, Lee Chi Kin, confirmed that Sartori would remain with the club next season.

On 10 June 2019, R&F announced the signing of Sartori on a monthly salary of HK$300,000 per month. On 14 October 2020, Sartori left the club after his club's withdrawal from the HKPL in the new season.

On 12 January 2021, Sartori signed with China League One club Meizhou Hakka. He would go on to be utilized as a vital member of the team that gained promotion to the top tier after coming second within the division at the end of the 2021 China League One campaign.

In 2022, Sartori signed J2 League side Ventforet Kofu. On 16 October 2022, he was brought his club win Emperor's Cup 2022 for the first time in history. He left from the club in 2022 after a season at Kofu.

On 6 January 2023, Sartori returned to Hong Kong and joined Kitchee SC.

Career statistics
(Correct )

according to combined sources on the Flamengo official website and Flaestatística.

Hong Kong

(Correct )

China

(Correct )

Japan

(Correct )

Honours

Club
Flamengo
Campeonato Carioca: 2014
Tai Po
Hong Kong Premier League: 2018–19
Ventforet Kofu
 Emperor's Cup: 2022
Kitchee
 Hong Kong Senior Challenge Shield: 2022–23

Individual
Hong Kong Footballer of the Year: 2019

References

External links
 
 
 

1993 births
Living people
Brazilian footballers
Campeonato Brasileiro Série A players
J1 League players
J2 League players
Hong Kong Premier League players
China League One players
Chinese Super League players
Kashima Antlers players
CR Flamengo footballers
Clube Atlético Bragantino players
Red Bull Brasil players
Tai Po FC players
R&F (Hong Kong) players
Meizhou Hakka F.C. players
Ventforet Kofu players
Kitchee SC players
Brazilian expatriate footballers
Brazilian expatriate sportspeople in Japan
Brazilian expatriate sportspeople in Hong Kong
Brazilian expatriate sportspeople in China
Expatriate footballers in Japan
Expatriate footballers in Hong Kong
Expatriate footballers in China
Association football forwards
Footballers from Rio de Janeiro (city)